The 1924–25 season was the 48th Scottish football season in which Dumbarton competed at national level, entering the Scottish Football League and the Scottish Cup. In addition Dumbarton played in the Dumbartonshire Cup and the Dumbartonshire Charity Cup.

Scottish League

Dumbarton's third consecutive season in the Second Division began well with just 4 losses in the first 20 games, and at the turn of the year were a point off the top of the league.  However any hopes for promotion were dashed by winning only one of the subsequent 8 games and despite a mini revival in February–March, in the end Dumbarton had to settle for 8th place out of 20, with 40 points - 10 behind champions Dundee United.

Scottish Cup

Dumbarton reached the second round before being knocked out by First Division Falkirk.

Dumbartonshire Cup
Dumbarton lost to Helensburgh in the county cup final.

Dumbartonshire Charity Cup
Dumbarton finished as runners-up losing out to Clydebank in the final.

Player statistics

Squad 

|}

Source:

Transfers

Players in

Players out 

In addition Arthur King and Robert Robertson played their last games in Dumbarton 'colours'.

Source:

References

Dumbarton F.C. seasons
Scottish football clubs 1924–25 season